The Special Olympics World Games silver dollar is a commemorative silver dollar issued by the United States Mint in 1995.

See also

 List of United States commemorative coins and medals (1990s)
 United States commemorative coins

References

1995 establishments in the United States
Modern United States commemorative coins
Special Olympics